The Legacy of the Beast World Tour was a concert tour by British heavy metal band Iron Maiden, named after the comic and mobile game released by the band in 2017. Described as a "history/hits tour", Iron Maiden manager Rod Smallwood has revealed that the concerts and stage design will feature "a number of different but interlocking ‘worlds’ with a setlist covering a large selection of 80s material with a handful of surprises from later albums."

The Legacy of the Beast Tour production and set list were inspired by Maiden's free-to-play mobile game of the same name is available on iOS and Android. The first leg, consisting of 38 European dates in 2018, was announced on 13 November 2017. The tour was extended into 2019 with North and South American dates and again into 2020 with Dates in Australia, New Zealand, Asia (Featuring their first ever show in The Philippines) and another run in Europe.

In March it was announced that the 2020 Oceania, Download Festival, and The Philippines shows were cancelled due to the COVID-19 pandemic. In April 2020, it was announced that Japan, Copenhell festival in Copenhagen, Graspop Metal Meeting in Belgium, the show in Wiener Neustadt, Austria, Germany, Paris, Tons of Rock, and Dubai were cancelled and next - postponed to 2021. In April 2021 it was announced that whole 2021 tour was cancelled once again and most of the European shows were rescheduled for 2022. The band cancelled their concerts in Kyiv and Moscow due to the 2022 Russian invasion of Ukraine in order to "ensure the safety of their fans".

With 140 shows, it was the longest tour with Bruce Dickinson on vocals since the "Somewhere on Tour" in 1986–1987. The tour started in Tallinn, Estonia in May 2018 and concluded in October 2022 in Tampa, Florida. Eventually Iron Maiden performed to over 3.5 million fans and the tour was honored with CAA & K2 Award.

Opening acts

2018 

Killswitch Engage 26 May – 1 July 31 July – 11 August
Sabaton – 14 July
 Gojira– 14 July
 Rhapsody of Fire- Trieste
 The Raven Age 10 June – 17 July
 Tremonti 9 July – 18 July

2019 

 The Raven Age – 18 July - 15 October
 Fozzy – 14 September
 Rage In My Eyes – 9 October 
 Serpentor – 12 October

2022
Airbourne – 13, 20, 26 and 27 June; 2, 4, 7, 9, 10, 20, 22, 26, 29 and 31 July
Within Temptation - 24, 29 and 31 July and all October dates
Lord of the Lost - 31 May, 2, 7, 20 and 30 June; 2, 4, 7, 9, 10 and 24 July
 The Hellacopters - 22 July
Sabaton - 26 July
Shinedown - 7, 13 June
Powerwolf - 20 July
 Avatar - 27, 30 August and 4 September
 Mastodon - 7 September
Trivium - 11 September - 30 September

Setlist 
{{hidden
| headercss = background: #fe001a; font-size: 100%; width: 65%;
| contentcss = text-align: left; font-size: 100%; width: 75%;
| header = 2018–2019
| content = 
"Churchill's Speech" (tape)/"Aces High" 
"Where Eagles Dare"
"2 Minutes to Midnight"
"The Clansman" 
"The Trooper" 
"Revelations"
"For the Greater Good of God" 
"The Wicker Man" 
"Sign of the Cross" 
"Flight of Icarus" 
"Fear of the Dark" 
"The Number of the Beast" 
"Iron Maiden"
Encore
 "The Evil That Men Do" 
"Hallowed Be Thy Name" 
"Run to the Hills" 
}}
{{hidden
| headercss = background: #fe001a; font-size: 100%; width: 65%;
| contentcss = text-align: left; font-size: 100%; width: 75%;
| header = 2022
| content = 
"Senjutsu"
"Stratego" 
"The Writing on the Wall" 
"Revelations"
"Blood Brothers"
"Sign of the Cross" 
"Flight of Icarus" 
"Fear of the Dark" 
"Hallowed Be Thy Name" 
"The Number of the Beast"
"Iron Maiden"
Encore
"The Trooper" 
"The Clansman" 
"Run to the Hills" 
Encore 2
"Churchill's Speech" (tape)/"Aces High" 
}}

Tour dates

Cancelled shows

Box office score data

Notes

References 

2018 concert tours
2019 concert tours
2022 concert tours
Iron Maiden concert tours
Concert tours postponed due to the COVID-19 pandemic